Coleophora chalepa is a moth of the family Coleophoridae. It is found in Russia.

References 

chalepa
Moths of Asia
Moths described in 1993